Douglas "Doug" S. Davies (23 July 1899 – ) was a Scottish international rugby union player, who played for  and the British & Irish Lions at number 8.

Davies was born in Ashkirk, Scottish Borders.  He was capped 24 times for Scotland.

He also played for Hawick RFC, and was on the 1924 British Lions tour to South Africa.

He died, aged, 87, in Peel, Isle of Man.

References
 Bath, Richard (ed.) The Scotland Rugby Miscellany (Vision Sports Publishing Ltd, 2007 )
 Massie, Allan A Portrait of Scottish Rugby (Polygon, Edinburgh)

External links
 player profile on scrum.com

1899 births
1987 deaths
British & Irish Lions rugby union players from Scotland
Hawick RFC players
Melrose RFC players
Rugby union players from Scottish Borders
Scotland international rugby union players
Scottish rugby union players